Sean Oliver may refer to:

 Sean Harris Oliver, Canadian actor and playwright
 Sean Oliver, (1963–1990), member of the band Rip Rig + Panic